Polythlipta guttiferalis is a moth in the family Crambidae. It was described by George Hampson in 1909. It is found in Uganda.

References

Endemic fauna of Uganda
Spilomelinae
Moths described in 1909